Zhu Ling (simplified Chinese: 朱玲, born July 10, 1957) is a Chinese volleyball player who competed in the 1984 Summer Olympics.

In 1984 she was a member of the Chinese volleyball team which won the gold medal. She played all five matches.

Zhu was born in Laiwu, Shandong Province. She started volleyball training in 1970 in Chongqing, and was admitted into Sichuan provincial team in 1975. Zhu was admitted into Chinese national team in 1979, and later, helped China to win both World Cup in 1981 and the Olympics in 1984. After retirement, Zhu studied in Department of Chinese Literature at Sichuan University. Since graduation, she has been serving at Sichuan Provincial Sports Bureau. In 2004, Zhu was promoted to the director of the Bureau.

Awards

National team
 1981 World Cup -  Gold Medal
 1984 Los Angeles Olympic Games -  Gold Medal

External links
 Profile

1957 births
Living people
Volleyball players at the 1984 Summer Olympics
Olympic volleyball players of China
Olympic gold medalists for China
Olympic medalists in volleyball
Volleyball players from Shandong
People from Laiwu
Chinese women's volleyball players
Medalists at the 1984 Summer Olympics
Sportspeople from Jinan
20th-century Chinese women